Nicholas Paul William Newbould (born February 10, 1976), known professionally as Nick Newbould), is a British American actor and producer. He is one of Britain's well-known theatre and pantomime actors.

Early life and education 
Newbould was born on February 10, 1976, in Pontefract, West Yorkshire, England. To window cleaner Paul Anthony Colley and Psychiatric nurse Lynn Vera Colley. His parents were both from Pontefract and had English and Irish ancestry. Newbould has 1 sister named Paige Lynn Vera, and 4 brothers, Martyn Lee Alan, Timothy Wesley James, Bradley William Alexander, and Ayden Alexander Curtis. Newbould grew up in a Christian upbringing. He later described his childhood as “great, we may never have had all the designer clothes, but we certainly had the best of love” Newboulds parents divorced in 1999. 

Newbould went to school in Pontefract. After he finished high School, Carleton High School - Pontefract. He then went onto study at Wakefield College and then to Leeds Met University. Newbould studied acting and musical theatre along with taking classes in hospitality. Newbould is still close friends with all his friends from school and visits them often.

Career 
Newbould began acting in the early 1990s and made his breakthrough with leading roles in the comedy Dracula Spectacular and various Theatre shows. As a leading Character actor Newbould has starred in multiple commercially successful theatre shows and pantomimes, including Aladdin (2008), The Opera House, Manchester, Dick Whittington (2007) The Lowry Theatre, Salford, Jack and the Beanstalk (2011) The Southport Theatre and Convention Center, The Rocky Horror Show (2009), Manchester Palace Theatre, Bad Boy Johnny and The Prophets of Doom (2010) UK Theatre Tour, London Shaw Theatre, Wizard of Oz (2011) UK Tour, Poole Lighthouse Theatre, Dorset. 

In 1998, Newbould learned of his love of travel. In between acting jobs Newbould decided he wanted to fly as cabin crew (flight attendant) he joined British Airways and then later Thomas Cook Airlines where he trained as cabin crew and would occasionally fly to keep his qualification. Newbould would often be asked by passengers of flight where they know him from, Newbould would always say he did not know. Newbould was once noticed by a passenger on a long-haul flight after the onboard magazines featured a picture of him in a show. Newbould was then asked to sit and not work the rest of the flight as not to confuse the passengers.

Newbould’s performances as a musical theatre actor and pantomime star earned him his rights to move into film and television. Alongside him being invited to be a guest warm up artist for various TV shows, like ITV’s Loose Women and Dancing on Ice he has appeared in many TV shows and worldwide commercials – Philip Ridley's Vincent River (2006), John Bishop, Panto! the Series while being the worldwide face in commercials for BBC’s Lifestyle worldwide show Come Dine with Me.

Personal life 
Newbould met the late footballer Justin Fashanu at a club in 1993 while working in Scotland. Both Newbould and Fashanu started a relationship and resided in Edinburgh. Newbould left Fashanu in 1994 and returned to England. Newbould then had a 2-year relationship with Dean Greenwood, Greenwood a hairdresser is now the husband of UK’s top Violinist Craig Halliday. Newbould and Greenwood are still close friends. Newbould is married to Paul Quirk a vice president for an american corporation. They met in October of 1997 while on vacation in Barbados and St Lucia. They secretly married in Beverly Hills in October 2020 and celebrated in private at the Beverly Hills Hotel.

References

External links 
 

Living people
1976 births
People from Pontefract
English gay actors
English male stage actors